Alexander Robertson "Duke" Wellington (August 4, 1891 – September 20, 1967) was a Canadian ice hockey player. Wellington played senior ice hockey and one game in the National Hockey League for the Quebec Bulldogs during the 1919–20 NHL season.

Wellington played junior hockey with the Port Arthur YMCA, moving up to senior hockey with the Port Arthur Stingrays in 1911. He continued in the Thunder Bay Senior League until 1915 when he played for St. Paul of the USAHA and seven games for Pittsburgh Duquesne Garden. Wellington moved to New York City in 1916, but was ruled ineligible to play there as a non-resident. The following season he played for the New York Wanderers of the USNHL. He played one game as a free agent for Quebec of the NHL in 1919–20, playing against the Ottawa Senators on January 10, 1920, but returned to New Larochelle-New York of the USAHA for the rest of the season. In 1920–21, he split his final season between the Port Arthur Bearcats and New Larochelle.

Career statistics

Regular season and playoffs

See also
List of players who played only one game in the NHL

References

External links

1891 births
1967 deaths
Canadian ice hockey right wingers
Ice hockey people from Ontario
Quebec Bulldogs players
Sportspeople from Thunder Bay